Tin Sritrai (born 22 August 1989) is a Thai racing driver currently competing in the TCR Asia Series. Having previously competed in the Asian Formula Renault Series, Formula Pilota China and Asian Touring Car Series amongst others.

Racing career
Sritrai began his career in 2003 in karting, he won three titles before ending his karting career in 2008. In 2010 he switched to the Asian Formula Renault Series, where he finished 2nd in the championship standings that year. He raced in the Formula Pilota China championship in 2011, finishing 5th in the championship standings. In 2012 he switched to the Asian Touring Car Series, he has won the championship four times from 2012–14 and currently leads the 2015 standings. He raced in the Thailand Super Series from 2013–14 and won the championship both years.

In October 2015 it was announced that he would race in the TCR Asia Series & TCR International Series, driving a SEAT León Cup Racer for Asia Racing Team. It was also announced that he would become the first Thai racing driver to race in the World Touring Car Championship, driving a Chevrolet RML Cruze TC1 for Campos Racing.

Racing record

Complete TCR International Series results
(key) (Races in bold indicate pole position) (Races in italics indicate fastest lap)

Complete World Touring Car Championship results
(key) (Races in bold indicate pole position) (Races in italics indicate fastest lap)

References

External links
 

1989 births
Living people
TCR Asia Series drivers
TCR International Series drivers
World Touring Car Championship drivers
Tin Sritrai
Asia Racing Team drivers
Campos Racing drivers
Formula Masters China drivers
Tin Sritrai